August Hollenstein (28 March 1920 – 31 October 2003) was a Swiss sports shooter. He competed at the 1952 Summer Olympics, 1960 Summer Olympics and 1964 Summer Olympics.

References

External links
 

1920 births
2003 deaths
Swiss male sport shooters
Olympic shooters of Switzerland
Shooters at the 1952 Summer Olympics
Shooters at the 1960 Summer Olympics
Shooters at the 1964 Summer Olympics
Sportspeople from Thurgau
20th-century Swiss people